"Consolation Prizes" is a song by French rock band Phoenix and is featured on their third studio album, It's Never Been Like That. It was released 11 September 2006 as the second single from that album (see 2006 in music).

The promotional video for the song was directed by Daniel Askill on location in Paris over the course of 3 nights. It was released 17 July 2006 on the Phoenix homepage.

Track listings
Promo CD SOURCDJ124 / 0946 3 68640 2 0
"Consolation Prizes" – 3:16
7" SOUR124
"Consolation Prizes" – 3:16
"Consolation Prizes" (remix by L'Aiglon)
CD SOURCD124 / 0946 3 74956 2 9
"Consolation Prizes" – 3:16
"Consolation Prizes" (extended version)

References

External links
Phoenix – Consolation Prizes video at Virgin.net
[ Phoenix discography: Consolation Prizes] at Billboard.com

2006 singles
Phoenix (band) songs
2006 songs
Songs written by Thomas Mars
Songs written by Laurent Brancowitz
Song recordings produced by Tony Hoffer